Orel Baye (born 2 March 2004) is an Israeli professional footballer who plays as a winger for Israeli Premier League club Maccabi Tel Aviv and both the Israel national under-19 team.

Early life 
Baye was born in Ness Ziona, Israel.

Club career

Maccabi Tel Aviv
Baye made his senior debut with Israeli side Maccabi Tel Aviv on 3 March 2022 at the 4-0 win against Maccabi Jaffa at the Israeli State Cup. 

On 10 May 2022 he also made his senior Israeli Premier League club line-up debut for Maccabi Tel Aviv at the 2-1 win against Maccabi Haifa

International career
He plays for both the Israel national under-19 team.

Career statistics

Club

References

External links 
 

2004 births
Living people
Israeli footballers
Maccabi Tel Aviv F.C. players
Israeli Premier League players
Footballers from Ness Ziona
Israel youth international footballers
Association football midfielders
Israeli people of Ethiopian-Jewish descent